Arkaprabha Sinha (born 29 July 1998) is an Indian cricketer. He made his List A debut on 9 October 2019, for Tripura in the 2019–20 Vijay Hazare Trophy. He made his Twenty20 debut on 8 November 2019, for Tripura in the 2019–20 Syed Mushtaq Ali Trophy. He made his first-class debut on 12 February 2020, for Tripura in the 2019–20 Ranji Trophy.

References

External links
 

1998 births
Living people
Indian cricketers
Tripura cricketers
Place of birth missing (living people)